Adlington railway station may refer to:

Adlington railway station (Cheshire)
Adlington railway station (Lancashire)

See also
 Addington railway stations in Christchurch, New Zealand; see